Dom João Manuel, Hereditary Prince of Portugal (3 June 1537 – 2 January 1554) was a Portuguese infante (prince), the eighth son of King John III of Portugal by his wife Catherine of Austria, daughter of Philip I of Castile and Joanna of Castile. As the heir to the throne he was styled Prince of Portugal.

Early life 

João Manuel was born on 3 June 1537 in the Royal Palace of Évora and became the heir to the throne of Portugal in 1539. He survived his four older brothers who died in childhood but was a sickly teenager. The successive inter-marriages between the houses of Spain and Portugal are believed to have some responsibility for his ill health.

On 11 January 1552, he married Princess Joanna of Spain, his first double-cousin, through both paternal and maternal line, daughter of his paternal aunt Isabella of Portugal and of his maternal uncle, Emperor Charles V.

Death 
João Manuel died of what the sources refer to as consumption, which may refer to tuberculosis, on 2 January 1554, but some historians believe his death occurred as a result of diabetes, a disease he may have inherited from his maternal grandfather, Philip I. Eighteen days later, a posthumous son was born from his marriage: the future King Sebastian I of Portugal.

Ancestry

References

External links 

House of Aviz
Princes of Portugal
Portuguese infantes
Heirs apparent who never acceded
16th-century deaths from tuberculosis
1537 births
1554 deaths
People from Évora
16th-century Portuguese people
Tuberculosis deaths in Portugal
Children of John III of Portugal
Sons of kings